Dale Jackson Career Center (DJCC) or Technology, Exploration and Career Center West (TECC-W or TECC-West) is the first of two vocational schools built by the Lewisville Independent School District. DJCC serves students from the five Lewisville ISD high schools - Lewisville High School, Marcus High School, The Colony High School, Hebron High School, and Flower Mound High School - and each school's respective 9th and 10th grade campuses. It was started in 1985 as a technical high school where students from all the district high schools could attend one or two class periods at a time for specialized subjects.  Most of the classes are technical courses that lead to high-demand careers.

Departments 
Ad Design
American Sign Language
Animation
Auto Collision Repair
Auto Technology
Computer Maintenance
Content Mastery
Cosmetology
Criminal Justice
Electronics and Internetworking
Health Science Technology
Hospitality
Media Technology
Mill and Cabinetry
Welding
Each department has its own instructor and class lengths are 3 hours (two periods) with students choosing to attend either a morning or afternoon session. Classes require the student to be in an LISD high school (although there are certain classes that require you to have attained 10th or 11th grade), and are offered through senior year.

History 
The center was named for Dr. Robert Dale Jackson, Lewisville's first doctor. Dr. Jackson began as a pediatrician in the 1960s. As his patients aged, he later opened his office to serve as a family practice, serving his original patients, their children and later their grandchildren. Dr. Jackson was a widely loved man who served his local community for more than 40 years until his death in April 2001. He served as the local high school's team doctor and as school board president for several years.

External links
 Dale Jackson Career Center

Lewisville Independent School District
High schools in Denton County, Texas
Public high schools in Texas